Miriam Gutiérrez Parra (born 21 February 1983) is a Spanish professional boxer who has held the WBA interim female lightweight title since 2019. As of September 2020, she is ranked as world's fifth best active female lightweight by The Ring.

Professional career
Gutiérrez made her professional debut on 31 March 2017, scoring a five-round unanimous decision (UD) victory over Vanesa Caballero at the Casino Gran Madrid in Torrelodones, Spain.

Professional boxing record

References

External links

Living people
1983 births
Spanish women boxers
Boxers from San Francisco
Lightweight boxers